Scott Tuma is a musician from Chicago who is best known for his live performances and also for having played guitar in the pioneering alt-country band Souled American. Since his departure from Souled American in the late 1990s Tuma has released numerous solo albums, performed and recorded with Chicago's Boxhead Ensemble, and collaborated with members of the band Zelienople in a project dubbed Good Stuff House.

Tuma's unique guitar work is one of the primary features responsible for Souled American's highly distinct sound, though the band has continued playing without him seeming relatively unfazed by Tuma's departure. His solo work is more in line with ambient music than folk or country, though elements of those and other styles are still present. "Hard Again" and "The River 1 2 3 4" are expansive, gorgeous albums that feature Tuma playing most of the instruments himself - primarily guitar, harmonium, and organ (though he also plays bass, harmonica, and banjo) - though "Hard Again" also includes guest spots from members of Dirty Three, Rachel's, and Boxhead Ensemble.

Discography
 2001 Hard Again (Atavistic Records) 
 2003 The River 1 2 3 4 (Truckstop Records)
 2008 Not For Nobody (Digitalis Recordings)
 2009 Taradiddle With Mike Weis LP (Digitalis Recordings)
 2010 Peeper/Love Songs Loud and Lonely - Split with Brothers Pus (Bathetic) 
 2010 Dandelion (Digitalis Recordings)
 2014 "Hard Again / The River 1 2 3 4 (2xLP) (Scissor Tail Editions)
 2014 'Cracker Where am I?' Cassette' (Bathetic -Dynasty at Ghost Town'
 2015  Eyrie (Immune)
 2016 "Ragged Hollow 12" Split w/ Nevada Greene" (Hitt Records)
 2017 'No Greener Grass' 2xLP ([Dismal Niche])

Featured in Film
 2010 The Wolf Knife by Laurel Nakadate
 2015 Felt by Jason Banker
 2016 Accident Report by Mike Hoolboom

With the Boxhead Ensemble
 1998 The Last Place to Go (Atavistic Records)
 2001 Two Brothers (Atavistic Records)
 2003 Quartets (Atavistic Records)

With Souled American
 1988 Fe (Rough Trade Records)
 1988 Flubber (Rough Trade Records)
 1990 Around the Horn (Rough Trade Records)
 1992 Sonny (Rough Trade Records)
 1994 Frozen (Moll Tonträger)
 1996 Notes Campfire(Moll Tonträger)

With Good Stuff House
 2006 "Good Stuff House" CD-R (Time-Lag Records)
 2008 "Endless Bummer" (Root Strata)

Other guest appearances
 2000 Jack the Dog - "Missa Canibus" (set design, Orchard Records)
 2002 Bevel - "Where Leaves Block the Sun" (harmonica, Jagjaguwar Records)

References
 Tiny Mix Tapes review of No Greener Grass
  Lost in a Sea of Sound Blog Review of No Greener Grass
 SF Weekly article
 [ AllMusic entry for Hard Again]
 [ AllMusic entry for The River 1 2 3 4]

American alternative rock musicians
American country guitarists
American male guitarists
American rock guitarists
Boxhead Ensemble members
Living people
Year of birth missing (living people)